Princess Iniga of Thurn and Taxis (German Iniga Anna Margarete Wilhelmine Luise, Prinzessin von Thurn und Taxis, 25 August 1925, Schloss Niederaichbach, Niederaichbach, Bavaria, Germany – 17 September 2008, Aufhausen, Germany) was a princess of the House of Thurn and Taxis by birth and a Princess of Urach through her marriage to Prince Eberhard von Urach, member of a morganatic branch of the former royal House of Württemberg .

Family
Iniga was the second child and only daughter of Prince Ludwig Philipp of Thurn and Taxis and his wife Princess Elisabeth of Luxembourg.

Marriage and issue
Iniga married Prince Eberhard von Urach (1907–1969), eighth child of Wilhelm, 2nd Duke von Urach and his wife Duchess Amalie in Bavaria, civilly 18 May 1948 in Niederaichbach and religiously 20 May 1948 in Regensburg. Prince Eberhard served as a reconnaissance officer in 1938–44 and was promoted to major. Iniga and Eberhard had issue:

Princess Amelie von Urach (b. 6 April 1949), married Curt-Hildebrand von Einsiedel in 1974. They have eight children and seven grandchildren:
Alexander von Einsiedel (b. 4 January 1976)
Elisabeth Helene von Einsiedel (b. 4 May 1977) married Count Amaury du Réau de La Gaignonnière on 14 February 2012 and they were divorced. She remarried Ulrich Kunhardt von Schmidt on 17 May 2014. They have one son:
Georg Alexander Kunhardt von Schmidt (b. 29 March 2014)
Iniga von Einsiedel (b. 11 January 1979) married Count Botho von Lüttichau on 6 June 2015.
Sophie von Einsiedel (b. 2 March 1980) married Christian von Eichborn on 15 May 2004. They have one daughter:
Iniga Marianne Magdalene von Eichborn (b. 30 April 2006)
Therese von Einsiedel (b. 17 January 1984) married Prince François d'Orléans, Count of Dreux on 26 July 2014. They have three children:
 Prince Philippe Ferdinand of Orléans (b. 5 May 2017)
Princess Marie Amélie of Orléans (b. 8 February 2019)
Prince Raphaël of Orléans (b. 4 September 2021)
Victoria von Einsiedel (b. 30 July 1986)
Valerie von Einsiedel (b. 30 July 1986)
Felicitas von Einsiedel (b. 23 February 1990) married Alexander von Kempis in 2015. They have three children:
Marie von Kempis (b. 2016) 
Theresa von Kempis (b. 2017)
N von Kempis (b. 2019)
Princess Elisabeth von Urach (10 December 1952 – 20 September 2012)
Karl Anselm, Duke von Urach (b. 5 February 1955) married Saskia Wüsthof on 9 February 1990 and they were divorced in 1996. They have two sons. He remarried Uta Maria Priemer on 2 September 2014.
Wilhelm Albert, Duke von Urach (b. 9 August 1957) married Karen von Brauchitsch-Berghe von Trips, civilly on 23 December 1991 and religiously on 1 February 1992. They have three children:
Prince Karl Philipp von Urach (b. 6 July 1992)
Princess Alexandra-Charlotte von Urach (b. 18 February 1994)
Princess Louise Antonia von Urach (b. 12 February 1996)
Prince Inigo von Urach (b. 12 April 1962), married Baroness Daniela von und zu Bodman on 21 September 1991. They have three children:
Prince Eberhard von Urach (b. 20 October 1990, born before his parents' marriage) 
Prince Anselm von Urach (b. 29 November 1992) married Clara von Kempis (b. 1991) in 2018. They have one child:
Princess Beatrice von Urach (b. 20 January 2021)
Princess Amelie von Urach (b. 11 November 1994)

After her father's death, Iniga inherited her father's estate Schloss Niederaichbach.

Death
Iniga died on 17 September 2008 at her home in Aufhausen. A requiem and funeral were held at the Wallfahrtskirche St. Maria Himmelfahrt in Aufkirchen am Starnberger See on 23 September 2008.  She was buried in the Friedhof Aufkirchen.

Ancestry

References

1925 births
2008 deaths
People from Landshut (district)
Princesses of Thurn und Taxis
Countesses of Württemberg
German Roman Catholics
Princesses of Urach